Alexander García Düttmann (born 1961 in Barcelona) studied Philosophy in Frankfurt as a student of Alfred Schmidt and in Paris as a student of Jacques Derrida.

Career 
After obtaining his PhD from Frankfurt, he spent two years at Stanford University as a Mellon Fellow. His first academic position in the UK was a lecturership in Philosophy at Essex University. Currently he is professor of Aesthetics and Art Theory at the Berlin University of the Arts.
He has taught at Monash University, Melbourne; at Middlesex University, where he was professor of Philosophy for seven years; at New York University, where he was a visiting professor in the autumn term of 1999; and at Goldsmiths, University of London, where he taught Philosophy and Visual Culture.

Work 
Düttmann has published a number of authored books, many of which have been translated into several languages (English, Italian, Croatian, Japanese). His research in the past few years has been focused on the philosophical problem of deconstruction, the concept of exaggeration in philosophy, Theodor Adorno’s moral philosophy and the work of Italian filmmaker Luchino Visconti. Yet Visconti turns out to be Düttmann's pretext rather than subject, according to Frankfurter Allgemeine Zeitung reviewer Bert Rebhandl: "This is the book's real flaw: We never learn why García Düttmann talks about Visconti at all." 

Currently, Düttmann deals with the question of participation in art and politics; he next will investigate the question of the contemporary in art, the relationship between photography and philosophy and the question of immortality in contemporary philosophy.

On more than one occasion, he has collaborated with artists. In 2004 the chamber opera Liebeslied / My Suicides, for which he wrote the libretto, and which featured music by Paul Clark and photographs by Rut Blees Luxemburg, opened at the Institute of Contemporary Arts (ICA) in London.

Publications (selection) 

1989: "La parole donnée", Paris: Galilée
1991: "Das Gedächtnis des Denkens: Versuch über Heidegger und Adorno", Frankfurt a.M.: Suhrkamp
1993: "Uneins mit Aids", Frankfurt a.M.: Suhrkamp
1997: "Zwischen den Kulturen", Frankfurt a.M.: Suhrkamp
1999: "Freunde und Feinde", Wien: Turia&Kant
2000: "Kunstende: Drei ästhetische Studien", Frankfurt a.M.: Suhrkamp
2004: "Philosophie der Übertreibung", Frankfurt a.M.: Suhrkamp
2004: "So ist es: Ein philosophischer Kommentar zu Adornos ’Minima Moralia’", Frankfurt a.M.: Suhrkamp
2005: "Verwisch die Spuren", Zürich/Berlin: diaphanes
2006: "Visconti: Einsichten in Fleisch und Blut", Berlin: Kulturverlag Kadmos
2008: "Derrida und ich. Das Problem der Dekonstruktion", Bielefeld: transcript
2011: "Teilnahme: Bewußtsein des Scheins": Konstanz: Konstanz University Press
2012: "Naive Kunst: Ein Versuch über das Glück", Berlin: August Verlag
2015: "Was weiß Kunst?: Für eine Ästhetik des Widerstands", Konstanz: Konstanz University Press

References

External links 
Goldsmiths, University of London
A Philosophical Cosmopolitan: Portrait of German Philosopher Alexander García Düttmann

1961 births
Living people
Spanish philosophers
20th-century German philosophers
Phenomenologists
Deconstruction
German male writers
21st-century German philosophers